Benedetto Ala (died 1620) was a Roman Catholic prelate who served as Archbishop of Urbino (1610–1620).

Biography
Benedetto Ala was born in Cremona, Italy.
On 5 May 1610, he was appointed during the papacy of Pope Paul V as Archbishop of Urbino.
On 9 May 1610, he was consecrated bishop by Michelangelo Tonti, Bishop of Cesena, with Metello Bichi, Bishop Emeritus of Sovana, and Alessandro Borghi, Bishop Emeritus of Sansepolcro, serving as co-consecrators.
He served as Archbishop of Urbino until his death on 27 Apr 1620.

References

External links and additional sources
 (for Chronology of Bishops) 
 (for Chronology of Bishops) 

17th-century Italian Roman Catholic archbishops
Bishops appointed by Pope Paul V
1620 deaths
Clergy from Cremona